Manfred Theodor Reetz (born 13 August 1943) is a German chemist and professor of organic chemistry, who served as director of the Max Planck Institute for Coal Research from 1991 until 2011. His research focuses on directed evolution, enzymes in organic chemistry, and stereoselective biocatalysis.

Biography
Reetz was born in Hirschberg, Lower Silesia, in 1943 and immigrated to the US in 1952. After studying chemistry at Washington University in St. Louis and the University of Michigan, he returned to Germany to obtain his Ph.D. under Ulrich Schöllkopf at the University of Göttingen. He subsequently worked as a postdoctoral researcher at the University of Marburg where he completed his habilitation in 1978. After two years at the University of Bonn, he returned to Marburg as full professor in 1980. In 1991 he was appointed director of the Max Planck Institute for Coal Research in Mülheim, a position that he held until 2011.

Honors and awards
He was elected to the German Academy of Sciences Leopoldina in 1997. He was elected a foreign member of the Royal Netherlands Academy of Arts and Sciences in 2005.

Selected publications

References

1943 births
People from Jelenia Góra
People from the Province of Silesia
20th-century German chemists
21st-century German chemists
Living people
Members of the German Academy of Sciences Leopoldina
Members of the Royal Netherlands Academy of Arts and Sciences
Organic chemists
University of Michigan alumni
Max Planck Institute directors
Washington University in St. Louis alumni
University of Göttingen alumni